"Pinocchio le clown" is a song by French virtual singer Pinocchio from his second album Magic Pinocchio. It was the album's opening track and it was released as its first single.  The single came out on March 2, 2007, one week before the album, and debuted at number 20 in France.

Track listing

Charts

References 

2007 songs
2007 singles
Pinocchio (singer) songs
EMI Music France singles